Ban Phaeng is a district (amphoe) in Nakhon Phanom province, northeast Thailand.

Geography
Neighboring districts are (from the south clockwise): Tha Uthen, Si Songkhram, and Na Thom of Nakhon Phanom Province, and Bueng Khong Long of Bueng Kan province. To the east across the Mekong river is the Laotian province Khammouan.

History
Originally the area belonged to the Mueang Chaiburi, now part of the Tha Uthen district.

The minor district (king amphoe) was established in 1948 by splitting it from Tha Uthen District. In 1956 it was elevated to full district status.

In 1956 the sanitary district (sukhaphiban) Ban Phaeng was established, which was upgraded to a sub-district municipality (thesaban tambon) in 1999.

Administration
The district is divided into six sub-districts (tambons), which are further subdivided into 75 villages (mubans). Ban Phaeng itself has a sub-district municipality (thesaban tambon) status and covers part of the tambon Ban Phaeng. There are a further five tambon tambon administrative organizations (TAO).

Missing number are tambon which now form Na Thom District.

References

External links
amphoe.com (Thai)

Ban Phaeng
Populated places on the Mekong River